Christopher Champain Tanner, AM (24 June 1908 – 22 May 1941) was a Gloucester, Barbarians and England Rugby Union international, winning 5 caps between 1930 and 1932. He was posthumously awarded the Albert Medal for assisting in the rescue of around 30 sailors in the Second World War.

Tanner was educated at Cheltenham College and Pembroke College, Cambridge. He was ordained in 1935; served curacies in Farnham, Surrey and Gloucester; and was Priest in charge of St Christopher, Haslemere. In 1937 he married Eleanor Rutherford: they had one daughter born after his death in 1941. In June 1940 he became a Chaplain with the Royal Naval Volunteer Reserve; and was awarded the Albert Medal for his work in attempting to save fellow shipmates when  was sunk during the Battle of Crete in May 1941. He succumbed to his exhaustion and died, aged 32, as soon as he was about to board . He is commemorated on the Commonwealth War Graves Commission Plymouth Naval Memorial. There is a Rood cross at St Christopher, Haslemere dedicated to his memory.

References

1908 births
Military personnel from Gloucestershire
People from Cheltenham
People educated at Cheltenham College
Alumni of Pembroke College, Cambridge
Gloucester Rugby players
Barbarian F.C. players
England international rugby union players
20th-century English Anglican priests
Royal Navy chaplains
Royal Naval Volunteer Reserve personnel of World War II
Recipients of the Albert Medal (lifesaving)
Royal Navy personnel killed in World War II
1941 deaths
Gloucestershire County RFU players